This is a list of the Estonia men's national basketball team results from 2020 to present.

2020

2021

2022

2023

Notes

References

External links
List of all games on Estonia national team homepage

Basketball in Estonia
Basketball games by national team
Estonia national basketball team